A guest house (also guesthouse) is a kind of lodging.  In some parts of the world (such as the Caribbean), guest houses are a type of inexpensive hotel-like lodging. In others, it is a private home that has been converted for the exclusive use of lodging. The owner usually lives in an entirely separate area within the property and the guest house may serve as a form of lodging business.

Overview

In some areas of the world, guest houses are the only kind of accommodation available for visitors who have no local relatives to stay with. Among the features which distinguish a guest house from a hotel, or inn is the lack of a full-time staff.

Bed and breakfasts and guest houses in England are family owned and the family lives on the premises though family members are not normally available during the evening. However, most family members work a 10- to 12-hour day from 6 am as they may employ part-time service staff. Hotels maintain a staff presence 24 hours a day and 7 days a week, whereas a guest house has a more limited staff presence. Because of limited staff presence, check-in at a guest house is often by appointment. An inn also usually has a restaurant attached.

In India, a tremendous growth can be seen in the guest house business especially in Delhi-NCR (national capital region) where progress in the IT sector and Commonwealth Games 2010 were two most influential factor. Nowadays the guest house accommodation sector has improved itself significantly, with even a home converted guest house also offering 3-star equivalent facilities to its guests.

Security 
Generally, there are two variations of paying guest house:
 Home converted guest house
 Professionally run guest house with all necessary amenities and staff
In the first version of the guest house the guest probably has to live with a family where they get shelter and food (bed and breakfast) only and for the rest of the jobs like washing clothes and utensils, cleaning of room or area around their bed is to be done by the guest. In the second version, the guest receives the all necessary amenities which are required to live life comfortably like a fully furnished room, comfortable bed, air-conditioner, TV, hot and cold water supply, and also one important aspect, security.

A big plus point of a professionally run paying guest accommodation service is that the owner follows the safety norms set by their local government. Some of the important safety points are:
 Fire safety with regular fire drills
 Disaster management
 Updated safety equipment
 Information signboards for guests and staff
 Government certifications

See also

Dharamshala (type of building)
Hotel
Ryokan
Secondary suite

References

External links
 
 
 

Hotel types